Rhagoletis indifferens, the western cherry fruit fly, is a pest that lives only on cherries. The adult form of this insect is slightly smaller than a housefly, with white stripes across the abdomen, yellow markings near the base of the wings, and black markings on the wings. The larva, which is the stage of this insect's lifecycle that causes the actual damage to the fruit, is similar to a typical fly larva or maggot. Female flies lay eggs in the cherries, where the larvae feed for 1–2 weeks before exiting. Western cherry fruit flies damage fruit by feeding, in both the adult and larval stages.

Distribution
This species is found in southeastern British Columbia in Canada, and  Arizona, California, Colorado, Idaho, Montana, New Mexico, Oregon, Utah, Washington, and Wyoming in the United States. It has been introduced to Switzerland.

References
Washington State University Fact Sheet

indifferens
Agricultural pest insects
Insects described in 1932